The 2023 season is the eighth season in the existence of Kelantan United Football Club and the club's first season in the Malaysia Super League. In addition to the league, they will also compete in the Malaysia FA Cup and the Malaysia Cup.

Coaching staff

Players

First-team squad

Transfers in

Transfers out

Statistics

Appearances and goals

|-
! colspan="18" style="background:#dcdcdc; text-align:center"| Goalkeepers

|-
! colspan="18" style="background:#dcdcdc; text-align:center"| Defenders

|-
! colspan="18" style="background:#dcdcdc; text-align:center"| Midfielders

|-
! colspan="18" style="background:#dcdcdc; text-align:center"| Forwards

|-
! colspan="18" style="background:#dcdcdc; text-align:center"| Players transferred out during the season
|-

Competitions

Malaysia Super League

Malaysia FA Cup

References

2023
Kelantan United